Kyler Cole Murray (born August 7, 1997) is an American football quarterback for the Arizona Cardinals of the National Football League (NFL). Following a stint at Texas A&M, Murray played college football at Oklahoma, where he won the Heisman Trophy as a junior. Murray was selected first overall by the Cardinals in the 2019 NFL Draft. He was also selected ninth overall by the Oakland Athletics of Major League Baseball (MLB) in the 2018 draft, making him the first player to be drafted in the first round of both sports.

In his first season, Murray was named NFL Offensive Rookie of the Year after setting several Cardinals franchise rookie quarterback records. He received consecutive Pro Bowl selections during his next two seasons, along with leading the Cardinals to the playoffs in 2021, their first appearance since 2015.

High school career

Football
Murray was born in Bedford, Texas to Kevin Murray and Misun Henderson. He attended Allen High School in Allen, Texas. As a senior in 2014, he was the Gatorade Football Player of the Year and became the first player to be named Mr. Texas Football twice. His team won three straight state championships and 43 games in a row. He missed one start during this streak and finished his career with a perfect 42–0 record as a starting quarterback.

Murray was ranked by ESPN, Scout.com, and 247Sports as a five-star recruit and the best dual-threat quarterback in his class. In May 2014, he committed to Texas A&M University to play college football and college baseball. He officially signed with them on February 4, 2015.

Statistics

Baseball
Murray also played baseball and was considered one of the top prospects for the 2015 Major League Baseball draft. In high school, Murray was a shortstop and a second baseman. He was the first player to ever be selected for both the Under Armour All-America Baseball Game and Under Armour All-America Football Game.

College career

Football

Texas A&M

As a true freshman in 2015, Murray competed with Kyle Allen before the season for the starting quarterback position. Allen won the job, with Murray appearing in games as a backup (primarily on plays involving the wildcat formation). After the team lost two straight games in October, the competition was opened again prior to the South Carolina game, and Murray won the starting quarterback position. In his first start, Murray threw for 223 yards and rushed for 156 yards with a passing touchdown and a rushing touchdown, making him and Cam Newton the only Southeastern Conference quarterbacks in the past 20 years to gain over 100 yards passing and rushing, including a passing touchdown and a rushing touchdown in their first career start. In his second start the next game against Auburn, Murray threw for 105 yards while throwing three interceptions, and rushing for 37 yards in the 26–10 loss. He rebounded from his previous game the next week against Western Carolina, throwing for 191 yards, 3 touchdowns and 2 interceptions, while rushing for 50 yards in the 41–17 blowout win. After the game, Allen was named the starting quarterback and Murray was sidelined for the rest of the season.

Oklahoma
On December 24, 2015, Murray announced that he was transferring to the University of Oklahoma. Per NCAA transfer rules, he had to miss the 2016 season.

2017

In the 2017 season, Murray was a backup quarterback to Baker Mayfield. He got the opportunity to play in some games in relief of Mayfield. He made his season debut in the season opener against UTEP. In the 56–7 victory, he came into the game in the second half and finished 10-of-11 for 149 yards and a touchdown. Two weeks later, against Tulane, he hit all three pass attempts for 103 yards and a touchdown. On November 25, against West Virginia, he started the game after Mayfield had to sit out some of the game due to disciplinary actions in the previous game against the Kansas Jayhawks. In the game, he hit both pass attempts for 52 total yards and a touchdown while contributing 80 rushing yards on three carries.

2018

Without Mayfield, Oklahoma considered Murray and Austin Kendall to start at quarterback in 2018. Murray was chosen as the starting quarterback. He threw for more than 4,000 yards and 42 touchdowns in the 2018 regular season, and rushed for over 1,000 yards and 12 rushing touchdowns. In December 2018, Murray won the Heisman Trophy as the best collegiate football player in the country, giving Oklahoma back-to-back Heisman winners. Murray helped lead Oklahoma to a Big 12 Championship win and an appearance in the College Football Playoff. In the 2018 Orange Bowl against Alabama, he threw for 308 passing yards and had two passing touchdowns as the Sooners lost by a score of 45–34. Murray became only the third Heisman Trophy winner to not be awarded consensus All-American honors.

Statistics

Baseball
Murray opted out of the MLB draft after deciding to attend Texas A&M. He was initially set to play as an infielder for the Texas A&M Aggies baseball team in the 2016 season until he announced his departure from Texas A&M on December 17, 2015.

Murray played for the Oklahoma Sooners baseball team in 2017 as a left fielder. He had a .122 batting average and six runs batted in (RBIs) in 27 games. After the 2017 season, he played collegiate summer baseball for the Harwich Mariners of the Cape Cod Baseball League. In 2018, playing as a centerfielder, Murray batted .296 with 10 home runs, 47 RBIs, and 10 stolen bases.

Despite Murray's reported intention to continue his football career, the Oakland Athletics selected Murray with the ninth overall selection of the 2018 MLB draft. He signed a contract with the Athletics which included a $4.66 million signing bonus. Prior to his junior year with the football team, Murray said that he would report to spring training in 2019 to begin his professional baseball career. However, following his Heisman Trophy-winning 2018 season, he would forgo his senior year and enter the NFL Draft. The A's retain his rights, should he return to baseball.

Professional career
In January 2019, Murray announced that he would enter the 2019 NFL Draft. On February 11, he announced his decision to focus on his football career, forgoing baseball.

Some believed that Murray's pursuit of a football career at the expense of a potential one in baseball was a mistake because of his limited stature relative to a typical NFL quarterback. At the NFL Combine, Murray was not expected to match his listed height of 5'10", because colleges often exaggerate measurements to make players more attractive to professional teams. Murray's final measurements were 5'10 1/8" and 207 pounds, similar to that of then-Seattle Seahawks starting quarterback Russell Wilson.

Despite not taking part in individual drills at the combine, many saw Murray's draft stock improve because of his greater-than-expected measurements, though some football scouts and pundits remain skeptical of the official listing. In contrast, NFL Network reporter Charley Casserly said that Murray had "the worst report I’ve ever heard on a top-ranked quarterback from the interview part of it", though Murray's agent disputed this report. Gil Brandt also questioned the veracity of Casserly's assertions. He was ranked as the best quarterback prospect available by multiple outlets and sports websites.

Murray was drafted first overall by the Arizona Cardinals in the 2019 NFL Draft, becoming the shortest quarterback drafted in the first round. When leading Texas Tech's football program, Cardinals head coach Kliff Kingsbury said that he would hypothetically spend the draft's top selection on Murray. The pick made Murray the first player to be drafted in the first round of both the NFL and MLB drafts, the first time that two quarterbacks from the same university have gone in the first round in successive seasons after Baker Mayfield was selected first in the 2018 NFL Draft and the first quarterback under 6 feet selected number one in an NFL draft. On May 9, 2019, Murray signed his four-year rookie contract, worth $35.2 million with the Cardinals.

2019

Murray played his first NFL game on September 8, 2019 against the Detroit Lions, finishing with 308 passing yards, two touchdowns, and an interception as the game ended in a 27–27 tie. Murray led the Cardinals to a comeback in the fourth quarter from a 16-point deficit, joining Jake Plummer as the only Cardinals rookie quarterbacks to throw for 300 yards and two touchdowns since the AFL-NFL merger in 1970. During Week 2 against the Baltimore Ravens, Murray finished with 349 passing yards as the Cardinals lost 23–17. In Week 4 against the Seattle Seahawks, Murray threw for 241 yards and a pick-six and rushed four times for 27 yards and his first NFL rushing touchdown in the 27–10 loss. In the next game against the Cincinnati Bengals, Murray threw for 253 yards and rushed for 93 yards and a touchdown in the 26–23 victory. During Week 6 against the Atlanta Falcons, Murray threw for 340 yards and three touchdowns and rushed 11 times for 32 yards in a narrow 34–33 victory. He was named the NFC Offensive Player of the Week for his performance.

In Week 10, against the Tampa Bay Buccaneers, Murray threw for 324 passing yards, three touchdowns, and one interception in the 30–27 loss. In Week 11 against the San Francisco 49ers, Murray threw for 150 yards and two touchdowns and rushed for 67 yards and a touchdown in the 36–26 loss. In Week 16 against the Seattle Seahawks, Murray threw for 118 yards and a touchdown and rushed for 40 yards before exiting the game due to a hamstring injury. Without Murray, the Cardinals won the game 27–13. Before the regular season finale against the Los Angeles Rams, Murray was listed as a game-time decision with a hamstring injury and ultimately played in the game despite being hurt. During the game, Murray threw for 325 yards, two touchdowns, and two interceptions during the 31–24 loss. Afterwards, Cardinals' head coach Kliff Kingsbury said that "It's the most proud I've been of him all season."

Murray finished his rookie season with 3,722 passing yards, 20 passing touchdowns, and 12 interceptions to go along with 544 rushing yards and four rushing touchdowns on 93 carries and was named a Pro Bowl Alternate. At the NFL Honors on February 1, Murray won the AP NFL Offensive Rookie of the Year Award for his performance during the season. He was ranked 90th by his fellow players on the NFL Top 100 Players of 2020.

2020

In Week 1 against the San Francisco 49ers, Murray finished with 230 passing yards, one passing touchdown, and an interception to go along with 91 rushing yards and a rushing touchdown in the 24–20 win. In Week 2 against the Washington Football Team, Murray passed for 286 yards, one passing touchdown, and one interception to go along with eight carries for 67 rushing yards and two rushing touchdowns in the 30–15 victory. During Week 5 against the New York Jets, Murray finished with 380 passing yards, 31 rushing yards, two total touchdowns, and one interception as the Cardinals won 30–10.

On October 14, 2020, Murray was named the NFC Offensive Player of the Week for his performance in Week 5. In Week 7 against the Seattle Seahawks on Sunday Night Football, Murray completed 34 of 48 passes for 360 yards, three touchdowns, and an interception plus ran 14 times for 67 yards and scored a rushing touchdown as the Cardinals beat the previously undefeated Seahawks 37–34 in overtime. Murray was also named NFC Offensive Player of the Week for his performance in Week 7. In Week 9, against the Miami Dolphins, he had 283 passing yards, three passing touchdowns, 106 rushing yards, and one rushing touchdown in the 34–31 loss.

In Week 10 against the Buffalo Bills, Murray passed for 245 yards, one passing touchdown, and one interception to go along with 11 carries for 61 rushing yards and two rushing touchdowns. He helped the Cardinals mount a comeback win in the final seconds; down 26–30, the Cardinals drove down to the Buffalo 43-yard line with 11 seconds to go before Murray scrambled out of the pocket and connected with DeAndre Hopkins, who was surrounded by three Bills defenders, on a Hail Mary pass. The resulting touchdown, dubbed the "Hail Murray" by the media, allowed Arizona to win 32–30 and take the division lead in the NFC West. In Week 15 against the Philadelphia Eagles, Murray threw for 406 yards, three touchdowns, and one interception, and rushed for 29 yards and another touchdown during the 33–26 win. Murray's performance in Week 15 earned him the NFC Offensive Player of the Week award, his third of the season.

Murray finished the 2020 season with 3,971 passing yards, 26 passing touchdowns, and 12 interceptions to go along with 133 carries for 819 rushing yards and 11 rushing touchdowns. Murray was named to the Pro Bowl for the first time in his career, and although the physical event was canceled due to the Covid-19  pandemic, an exhibition game was held online by means of the Madden 21 video game. Murray participated as one of 4 players representing the NFC, and won the match, earning Madden NFL 21 Pro Bowl MVP. He was ranked 39th by his fellow players on the NFL Top 100 Players of 2021.

2021

In Week 1 against the Tennessee Titans, Murray threw for 289 yards, four passing touchdowns, and one interception to go along with 20 rushing yards and a rushing touchdown as the Cardinals won 38–13. In Week 2 against the Minnesota Vikings, Murray finished with 400 passing yards, 31 rushing yards, two interceptions, and four total touchdowns as the Cardinals narrowly won 34–33 due to the Vikings missing a field goal with three seconds left in the fourth quarter. He was named NFC Offensive Player of the Week for his Week 2 performance. In Week 4 against the Los Angeles Rams, Murray passed for 268 yards and two passing touchdowns, winning 37–20 as the Cardinals snapped an 8-game losing streak against the Rams, beating them for the first time since 2016. In Week 6 against the Cleveland Browns, Murray threw for 229 yards and four passing touchdowns as the Cardinals won 37–14, improving to a league-best record of 6–0. The win also improved Murray's record to 2–0 against former college teammate Baker Mayfield, having previously beaten Mayfield and the Browns in Week 6 of 2019.

Prior to Week 8, Murray had led the Cardinals to the best record in the NFL at 7–0 before getting injured in the final minute of the Thursday Night Football loss against the Green Bay Packers. It was later reported that he suffered an ankle injury and ended up missing three weeks before returning in Week 13 against the Chicago Bears. In his first game back, Murray had 123 passing yards, 59 rushing yards, and four total touchdowns in the 33–22 win. In Week 14 against the Los Angeles Rams on Monday Night Football, Murray threw for 383 yards and two interceptions as the Cardinals lost 30–23. On Christmas Day against the Indianapolis Colts, Murray threw for 245 yards and a passing touchdown and rushed for 74 yards, including a career-long 57-yard run. However, the Cardinals missed two field goals and an extra-point, narrowly losing 22–16 and dropping their third consecutive game, having previously lost to the Detroit Lions in Week 15.

In Week 17 against the Dallas Cowboys, Murray and the Cardinals bounced back, beating the Cowboys 25–22, with Murray throwing for 263 yards and two touchdowns. Coming into Week 18, the Cardinals were one game back of the Los Angeles Rams in the NFC West standings, needing a Rams loss and a Cardinals win in order to overtake them. In the season finale against the Seattle Seahawks, Murray passed for 240 yards and one touchdown to go with 35 rushing yards. Despite this, the Cardinals lost 38–30, eliminating them from potentially winning the NFC West for the first time since 2015, as the Los Angeles Rams had lost earlier that day to the San Francisco 49ers.

Murray finished the 2021 regular season with 3,787 passing yards, 24 passing touchdowns, and 10 interceptions to go along with 88 carries for 423 rushing yards and 5 rushing touchdowns in 14 games played. Murray also made the Pro Bowl for a second straight season.

On January 17, 2022, Murray made his NFL postseason debut in the Wild Card Round, losing to the Los Angeles Rams 34–11. Murray struggled throughout the game, throwing for just 137 yards, two interceptions, and zero touchdowns, as well as setting a career low in passer rating (40.9). He was ranked 57th by his fellow players on the NFL Top 100 Players of 2022.

2022

The Cardinals picked up the fifth-year option on Murray's contract on April 27, 2022. On July 21, 2022, Murray signed a five-year, $230.5 million contract extension to stay with the Cardinals, with $160 million being guaranteed.

In the season opener against the Kansas City Chiefs, Murray threw for 193 yards, two touchdowns, and 29 rushing yards. However, the Cardinals defense gave up 44 points, allowing the Chiefs to score touchdowns on their first three drives as the Cardinals dropped their sixth consecutive home game, losing 44–21. In Week 2 against the Las Vegas Raiders, Murray and the Cardinals were shutout in the first half, with Murray throwing an interception as the Cardinals trailed 20–0 at halftime. However, Murray erupted in the second half, throwing for 277 yards and a touchdown plus a rushing two-point conversion, along with scoring a rushing touchdown and throwing for a second two-point conversion to tie with 0:00 left in regulation. The Cardinals would go on to win 29–23 in overtime. 

In Week 4 against the Carolina Panthers, Murray threw for 207 yards with two touchdowns and an interception to go along with a rushing touchdown as the Cardinals won 26–16. The win also improved Murray's record over former college teammate Baker Mayfield, moving him to 3–0 against his former teammate. In Week 7 against the New Orleans Saints on Thursday Night Football, Murray threw for 204 yards and a touchdown on 20-of-29 passing as the Cardinals won 42–34, snapping an eight-game losing streak at home. In Week 8 against the Minnesota Vikings, Murray scored his 100th career touchdown, becoming the 12th fastest player to reach that milestone.

In Week 14 against the New England Patriots on Monday Night Football, Murray suffered a non-contact knee injury in the first quarter. He was carted off the field and did not return. The next day, an MRI revealed that Murray tore his ACL, ending his season. He was placed on injured reserve on December 14, 2022. Murray finished the season with 2,368 passing yards, 14 passing touchdowns, and 7 interceptions to go along with 88 carries for 418 rushing yards and 3 rushing touchdowns in 11 games played.

NFL career statistics

Regular season

Postseason

Cardinals franchise records 
 Most games started by a rookie quarterback – 16
 Most pass completions by a rookie – 349
 Most pass attempts by a rookie – 542
 Highest completion percentage by a rookie (at least 2 completions) – 64.4%
 Most passing yards by a rookie – 3,722
 Most passing touchdowns by a rookie – 20
 Highest passer rating by a starting rookie – 87.4
 Most yards per game by a rookie – 232.6
 Most wins by a rookie quarterback – 5 
 Most rushing yards by a rookie quarterback – 544
 Most rushing touchdowns by a rookie quarterback – 4
 Most rushing yards per game by a rookie quarterback – 34.0
 Lowest interception percentage in a career  – 2.1%
 Highest completion percentage in a career  – 66.8%
 Most rushing yards by a quarterback in a career  – 2,204
 Most rushing touchdowns by a quarterback in a career  – 23

Personal life
Murray is a third-generation Korean American, with his maternal grandmother being a South Korean national.

Murray is a Christian. Murray's father, Kevin Murray, was a quarterback at Texas A&M from 1983 to 1986. His uncle, University of Texas alumnus Calvin Murray, is a former professional baseball player for the San Francisco Giants, Texas Rangers, and Chicago Cubs. His cousin, Devin Duvernay, is a University of Texas alumnus and is a wide receiver for the Baltimore Ravens.

Murray is an avid chess player, and he has said it has helped him become a better football player. As a child, he won school tournaments.

In April 2021, Murray signed with FaZe Clan.

See also
Hail Murray
List of Oklahoma Sooners starting quarterbacks
List of Oklahoma Sooners football statistical leaders

References

External links

 Arizona Cardinals profile
 Oklahoma Sooners profile
 
 
 
 

1997 births
Living people
African-American baseball players
African-American Christians
African-American players of American football
American baseball players of Korean descent
American football quarterbacks
American people of South Korean descent
American sportspeople of Korean descent
Arizona Cardinals players
Baseball players from Texas
Harwich Mariners players
Heisman Trophy winners
National Conference Pro Bowl players
National Football League first-overall draft picks
National Football League Offensive Rookie of the Year Award winners
Oklahoma Sooners baseball players
Oklahoma Sooners football players
People from Allen, Texas
People from Bedford, Texas
Players of American football from Texas
Sportspeople from the Dallas–Fort Worth metroplex
Texas A&M Aggies football players